Sarah Roberts may refer to:

 Sarah Roberts (actress) (born 1984), Australian television and film actress
 Sarah Roberts (politician) (born 1974), American politician from Michigan
 Sarah T. Roberts (born 1975), professor who specializes in content moderation of social media
 Sarah T. Roberts (epidemiologist), American epidemiologist
 Sarah Roberts (character), a character from the American serial drama One Life to Live